Ceratitis podocarpi is a species of fruit flies in the family Tephritidae. It is a pest of various cultivated species of Cucurbitaceae, especially the pumpkin, squash and melon. Ceratitis podocarpi is found in almost all Southern African countries like Ethiopia, Kenya, South Africa.

References 

Dacinae
Insect vectors of plant pathogens
Insects of South Africa
Insects of Kenya